Michael Wright (born 17 February 1950) is an English former footballer who made 89 appearances in the Football League for Darlington in the 1960s and 1970s. A defender, he went on to play non-league football for Crook Town.

References

1950 births
Living people
Footballers from Darlington
English footballers
Association football defenders
Darlington F.C. players
Crook Town A.F.C. players
English Football League players